Cape King is a cape along the coast of Victoria Land, Antarctica, forming the seaward end of the rocky west wall of Wylde Glacier where the glacier enters Lady Newnes Bay, Ross Sea. The cape was mapped by the United States Geological Survey from surveys and U.S. Navy air photos, 1960–64, and was named by the Advisory Committee on Antarctic Names for Geoffrey A. King, an ionospheric and geomagnetic scientist at Hallett Station, 1958.

References

Headlands of Victoria Land
Borchgrevink Coast